Another Cinderella Story is the soundtrack album from the 2008 film Another Cinderella Story. The album was released as a physical CD and digital download on August 26, 2008 by Razor & Tie. The album debuted number eight on the Billboard Top Soundtracks chart and has sold over 1,629,000 copies.

Critical reception
Mark Morton of AllMusic gave a review of the album: "Another Cinderella Story is a dynamic dance and music-filled update of the classic Cinderella fable starring up and coming actress/singer Selena Gomez. The soundtrack is loaded with modern pop and hip hop music, enchanting atmosphere of the film and its characters. Gomez performs the lead track and smash single "Tell Me Something I Don't Know", as well as three other songs on the album. Co-star and Gomez's film love interest Drew Seeley adds his heart-throb flair to five tracks as well".

Track listing

Charts

Release history

Extended play

Another Cinderella Story EP is a spinoff featuring Selena Gomez, from the film Another Cinderella Story. The EP was released by Razor & Tie.

Track listing

Release history

References

2008 soundtrack albums
2009 EPs
Pop soundtracks
Razor & Tie albums
A Cinderella Story (film series)